Stade Saniat Rmel (formerly known as La Hìpica) is a football stadium in Tétouan, Morocco. It is the home ground of Moghreb Athletic Tétouan.

References

Football venues in Morocco
Tétouan
Buildings and structures in Tanger-Tetouan-Al Hoceima
Moghreb Tétouan